MCFD is the common acronym for the Ministry of Children and Family Development (British Columbia)
 The volumetric flow rate equivalent to 1,000 (or sometimes 1,000,000) cubic feet per day is often shortened as Mcfd.